Luciola candezei, is a species of firefly beetle found in Sri Lanka.

References 

Lampyridae
Insects of Sri Lanka
Beetles described in 1902